The levels of education in Åland are primary, secondary and higher education. Education is compulsory between the ages of 6 and 15. Compulsory education consists of six years of primary and three years of lower secondary education. Upon completion of the third year of lower secondary education students can continue to the upper secondary education which is carried out by the Ålands Gymnasium. Higher education is offered at the Åland University of Applied Sciences. Education in Åland is administered and regulated by the Ministry of Education and Culture.

Overview
Swedish is the primary language of instruction in Åland. From 2001 to 2014, the percentage of compulsory schools' pupils that don't take courses in any other language than Swedish has increased from 16.8% to 31.2%. In 2013 the public spending on education was 53.932 million Euros, or 4.7 of GDP. In 2014 there were 657 teachers employed in all levels of education in Åland. The total enrollment in Åland was 4,491 students in 2014.

Primary education
Primary education in Åland is carried out in lower secondary school and it is provided by the municipalities. It consists of six classes, it is compulsory and is carried out from 7 to 12 years of age. In 2014 there were 1,910 students in primary education schools.

Secondary education

Lower secondary education in Åland is carried out in lower secondary schools and it is provided by the municipalities. It consists of three classes, it is compulsory and is carried out from 13 to 15 years of age. In 2014 there were 945 students in lower secondary school.

Upper secondary education in Åland is carried out in Åland Gymnasium, which itself consists of the Åland Vocational Gymnasium and the Åland Lyceum. The Åland Vocational Gymnasium provides professional training along with a high school diploma. Åland lyceum is a tertiary education preparatory secondary school, providing general education and broad eligibility for university off applied sciences and university studies. In 2014 there were 674 students in the Åland Vocational Gymnasium and 472 students in the Åland Lyceum.

Other schools
The Civic Institute is run by the City of Mariehamn; it provides informal education to adults that doesn't provide credits or special qualifications. The Ålands  Folk High School offers project-oriented courses in crafts. In 2014 the Ålands  Folk High School has 56 students.  Both schools offer Swedish language courses for immigrants.

Higher education

Åland University of Applied Sciences is a university of applied sciences based in Mariehamn. It was established in 1997 and took its current form on January 1, 2003 after it merged with the Åland Open University. Most courses are taught in Swedish, but there are some courses that are taught in English. In 2014 there were 490 students in the Åland University of Applied Sciences.

Marine education 
The Åland Islands founded Alandica Shipping Academy in 2020, which offers basic courses and refresher courses for seafarers as well as undergraduate marine education at high school and college level.

References

Education in Finland